Hrvatski Čuntić is a village in central Croatia, in the Town of Petrinja, Sisak-Moslavina County. It is connected by the D30 highway.

History
Archaeological site of the ruins of the Čuntić Tower is in recent years available for visitors after the excessive vegetation was removed. The tower was constructed in 1551 by the Kaptol to overlook the passage on a medieval road.

Demographics
According to the 2011 census, the village of Hrvatski Čuntić has 86 inhabitants. This represents 38.57% of its pre-war population according to the 1991 census.

Note: Settlements of Hrvatski Čuntić and Srpski Čuntić were reported separately from the 1948 census onwards. From 1857 to 1931, Hrvatski Čuntić and Srpski Čuntić  were reported as single settlement of Čuntić.

Notable people

References

Populated places in Sisak-Moslavina County